Jerry A. Shields (born June 9, 1937) is an ophthalmologist practicing at the Wills Eye Institute in Philadelphia, Pennsylvania, specializing in ocular oncology. He is also a professor at Thomas Jefferson University.

Education

Fellowship
 Wills Eye Hospital, Vitreoretinal Surgery, 1972, 1970
 Armed Forces Institute of Pathology, Ophthalmic Pathology, 1971

Residency
 Wills Eye Hospital, 1970

Medical school
 University of Michigan, 1964

Undergraduate
 Murray State University, 1960 - He received his Bachelor of Arts degree in Biology and was a member of Sigma Chi fraternity, Beta Beta Beta honorary society, and Who's Who.

Career
After graduating from the University of Michigan Medical School, he completed a residency in ophthalmology at Wills Eye Hospital and completed post-residency fellowships in ophthalmic pathology and retinal surgery. He is part of a full-time practice devoted to tumors and pseudotumors of the eyelids, conjunctiva, intraocular structures, and orbits.

Shields main contributions have been in the treatment of malignant melanoma which affects the eyes of adults, and retinoblastoma which affects the eyes of children. With regard to melanoma, Shields and his associates have improved and popularized techniques of local irradiation, local surgical resection, laser photocoagulation, and thermotherapy.  With regard to retinoblastoma, they have been active in improving techniques of local irradiation, laser photocoagulation, thermotherapy and chemotherapy.  He has also made research contributions in the diagnosis and treatment of other benign and malignant tumors, such as tumors of the ciliary body epithelium, pigment epithelium, and leiomyomas.

As of 2013, he had authored or co-authored more than 1,200 articles and textbook chapters and had authored or co-authored 13 major textbooks related to ocular tumors. He has lectured widely, having given 69 named lectures.

Publications
 Eyelid, Conjunctival, and Orbital Tumors and Intraocular Tumors • An Atlas and Text (Two-Volume Set)

References

External links
Physician Bio at Wills Eye Institute website
PubMed/NIH listing of published articles

American ophthalmologists
Living people
1937 births
University of Michigan Medical School alumni